Tobanga, or Northern Gabri, is an East Chadic language spoken in the Tandjilé Region of Chad.

References

Languages of Chad
East Chadic languages